Hamza Abourazzouk (born 16 June 1986) is a Moroccan footballer who plays as a forward. He played for Morocco in the 2014 FIFA World Cup qualification round, scoring against Ivory Coast in the first match.

Biography
Abourazzouk formed Wydad Casablanca and goes through the junior before being refused turned pro by the leader of Wydad Casablanca and from southern Morocco to the Youth of El Massira.

Abourazzouk began his professional football career in 2007 with the club from the youth of El Massira that in the first division. He plays with it until 2009 or for two seasons.

Abourazzouk won three major titles with the Maghreb Fez: CAF Cup, Throne Cup, and the CAF Super Cup in his three years there.

In 2012, he joined Raja CA.

Honours

Club

Maghreb Fez
Botola Vice-Champion: 2011

Tournament Antifi
Winner in 2011

CAF Confederation Cup
Winner in 2011

Throne cup
Winner: 2011
Finalist: 2010

CAF Super Cup
Winner: 2012

Country
Arab Cup Winner 2012

International goals

References

External links
Hamza Abourazzouk at Footballdatabase

1986 births
Living people
Moroccan footballers
Maghreb de Fès players
Raja CA players
JS Massira players
Moghreb Tétouan players
Botola players
Association football forwards